Rowan Nenzou (born 14 December 1982) is a retired Zimbabwean football midfielder.

References

1984 births
Living people
Zimbabwean footballers
Black Rhinos F.C. players
Shabanie Mine F.C. players
Gunners F.C. players
F.C. Platinum players
Zimbabwe international footballers
Association football midfielders
Zimbabwe Premier Soccer League players